The women's 400 metres event  at the 1974 European Athletics Indoor Championships was held on 9 and 10 March in Gothenburg.

Medalists

Results

Heats
Held on 9 March.First 2 from each heat (Q) and the next 2 fastest (q) qualified for the semifinals.

Semifinals
Held on 9 March.First 2 from each heat (Q) qualified directly for the final.

Final
Held on 10 March.

References

400 metres at the European Athletics Indoor Championships
400